Gerard Timothy McLauchlan (born 8 March 1989) is a Scottish footballer who plays as a defender in his second spell for Brechin City. McLauchlan has previously played for Hamilton Academical, Stranraer, Queen of the South, Ayr United, Cowdenbeath, Queen's Park and Pollok, as well as Montrose and Arbroath on loan. Although born in Bishopbriggs, McLauchlan is currently resident in the Gorbals, Glasgow.

Career
McLauchlan began his career at Hamilton Academical making two appearances before moving to Stranraer in July 2007. After making 34 appearances in total for the club he signed for Dumfries club Queen of the South in June 2008, on a two-year deal. During his time at The Doonhammers, McLauchlan went out on loan to both Montrose and Arbroath. After making seven league appearances for Queen of the South, McLauchlan moved to Brechin City, joining up with manager Jim Weir for a third time. In May 2015, McLauchlan signed for Ayr United after five years with Brechin City, however after only one season with the Honest Men, McLauchlan was released.

In July 2016, McLauchlan signed for recently relegated Scottish League Two side Cowdenbeath. McLauchlan played for one season at Cowdenbeath as the club fought off a relegation battle.

After playing a season in the juniors for Pollok, McLauchlan would once again play in the SPFL after returning to Brechin City in January 2021.

References

External links
 (Stranraer)
 (Queen of the South, Montrose)
 (Queen of the South, Brechin, Ayr United)
 (Arbroath)

Living people
1989 births
Scottish footballers
Hamilton Academical F.C. players
Stranraer F.C. players
Queen of the South F.C. players
Montrose F.C. players
Brechin City F.C. players
Ayr United F.C. players
Cowdenbeath F.C. players
Scottish Football League players
Association football defenders
Sportspeople from Bishopbriggs
Arbroath F.C. players
People educated at Turnbull High School
Scottish Professional Football League players
Queen's Park F.C. players
Pollok F.C. players